Robert Dale Morgan (May 27, 1912 – May 29, 2002) was a United States district judge of the United States District Court for the Central District of Illinois and the United States District Court for the Southern District of Illinois.

Education and career

Born in Peoria, Illinois, Morgan received a Bachelor of Arts degree from Bradley University in 1934. He received a Juris Doctor from University of Chicago Law School in 1937. He was in private practice of law in Peoria from 1937 to 1942. He was a United States Commissioner of the United States District Court for the Southern District of Illinois from 1938 to 1946. He was in the United States Army from 1942 to 1946. He was in private practice of law in Peoria from 1946 to 1967. He was Mayor of Peoria from 1953 to 1957.

Federal judicial service

Morgan was nominated by President Lyndon B. Johnson on May 24, 1967, to a seat on the United States District Court for the Southern District of Illinois vacated by Judge Frederick Olen Mercer. He was confirmed by the United States Senate on June 12, 1967, and received his commission the same day. He served as Chief Judge from 1972 to 1979. He was reassigned by operation of law on March 31, 1979, to the United States District Court for the Central District of Illinois to a new seat established by 93 Stat. 6. He served as Chief Judge from 1979 to 1982. He assumed senior status on May 28, 1982. His service was terminated on May 29, 2002, due to his death in Peoria.

Personal

Morgan married Betty Harbers Morgan of Peoria on October 14, 1939; she died in September 2010. They had two sons.

References

Sources
 

1912 births
2002 deaths
Bradley University alumni
Illinois Republicans
Judges of the United States District Court for the Central District of Illinois
Judges of the United States District Court for the Southern District of Illinois
Mayors of Peoria, Illinois
Military personnel from Illinois
United States district court judges appointed by Lyndon B. Johnson
20th-century American judges
University of Chicago Law School alumni
United States Army officers